Base Aérea de Boa Vista – ALA7  is a base of the Brazilian Air Force, located in Boa Vista, Brazil.

It shares some facilities with Atlas Brasil Cantanhede International Airport.

History
Boa Vista Air Force Base was commissioned on 25 August 1984. It is the only Brazilian Air Force Base located in the Northern Hemisphere.

Units
The following unit is based at Campo Grande Air Force Base:
 1st Squadron of the 3rd Aviation Group (1°/3°GAv) Escorpião, using the A-29A & B Super Tucano.

Access
The base is located 4 km from downtown Boa Vista.

Gallery
This gallery displays aircraft that are or have been based at Campo Grande. The gallery is not comprehensive.

Present aircraft

Retired aircraft

See also
List of Brazilian military bases
Atlas Brasil Cantanhede International Airport

References

External links

Roraima
Brazilian Air Force
Brazilian Air Force bases
Buildings and structures in Roraima
Boa Vista, Roraima